This is a list of candidates for the 1971 New South Wales state election. The election was held on 13 February 1971.

Retiring Members

Labor
 Laurie Brereton MLA (Randwick)
 Jack Mannix MLA (Liverpool)
 Robert McCartney MLA (Hamilton)

Country
 Bill Weiley MLA (Clarence)

Legislative Assembly
Sitting members are shown in bold text. Successful candidates are highlighted in the relevant colour. Where there is possible confusion, an asterisk (*) is also used.

See also
 Members of the New South Wales Legislative Assembly, 1971–1973

References
 

1971